In enzymology, a flavonol-3-O-glycoside glucosyltransferase is an enzyme that catalyzes the chemical reaction

UDP-glucose + a flavonol 3-O-beta-D-glucosyl-(1->2)-beta-D-glucoside  UDP + a flavonol 3-O-beta-D-glucosyl-(1->2)-beta-D-glucosyl-(1->2)-beta-D-glucoside

Thus, the two substrates of this enzyme are UDP-glucose and [[flavonol 3-O-beta-D-glucosyl-(1->2)-beta-D-glucoside]], whereas its 3 products are UDP, flavonol, and [[3-O-beta-D-glucosyl-(1->2)-beta-D-glucosyl-(1->2)-beta-D-glucoside]].

This enzyme belongs to the family of glycosyltransferases, specifically the hexosyltransferases.  The systematic name of this enzyme class is UDP-glucose:flavonol-3-O-beta-D-glucosyl-(1->2)-beta-D-glucoside 2-O-beta-D-glucosyltransferase.

References

 

EC 2.4.1
Enzymes of unknown structure